Nambatingue Tokomon Dieudonné, often shortened to Nambatingue Toko  (born 21 August 1952) is a Chadian former professional footballer who played as a striker. He spent all of his career in France.

Playing career
Toko was born in N'Djamena, Chad. He is best remembered for his time at Paris Saint-Germain, where he became French cup winner in 1982 and 1983.

Coaching career
In 1990 Toko became a member of the technical staff at Paris Saint-Germain. He became a French state graduated professional coach assisting various coaches like Alain Giresse, Artur Jorge. He was in charge of assessing opposing teams and talent scouting for more than 11 years, until the arrival of Laurent Perpère as a new club president in 1999.

References

External links
 RC Paris Profile
 RC Strasbourg Profile
 

1952 births
Living people
People from N'Djamena
Association football forwards
Chadian footballers
Chad international footballers
US Albi players
OGC Nice players
FC Girondins de Bordeaux players
RC Strasbourg Alsace players
Valenciennes FC players
Paris Saint-Germain F.C. players
Racing Club de France Football players
Ligue 1 players
Ligue 2 players
Chadian expatriate footballers
Chadian expatriate sportspeople in France
Expatriate footballers in France